The 1968 United States Senate election in New York was held on November 5, 1968. Incumbent Republican U.S. Senator Jacob Javits defeated Democratic challenger Paul O'Dwyer and Conservative Party challenger James Buckley in a three-way race.

Major candidates

Republican
Jacob Javits, incumbent U.S. Senator

While Javits did not face any challengers for the Republican nomination, he did face a minor one when seeking the Liberal Party of New York's nomination.

Democratic
Eugene Nickerson, Nassau County Executive
Paul O'Dwyer, former New York City Councilman
Joseph Y. Resnick, U.S. Representative from Ellenville

Conservative
James L. Buckley, attorney and brother of conservative activist William F. Buckley

Results

See also 
 United States Senate elections, 1968

References

New York
1968
1968 New York (state) elections